Mendoravia is a genus of flowering plants in the family Fabaceae. It belongs to the subfamily Dialioideae. It contains a single species, Mendoravia dumaziana.

References

Dialioideae
Monotypic Fabaceae genera
Taxa named by René Paul Raymond Capuron